Italy competed at the 1965 Summer Universiade in Budapest, Hungary and won 9 medals.

Medals

Details

References

External links
 Universiade (World University Games)
 WORLD STUDENT GAMES (UNIVERSIADE - MEN)
 WORLD STUDENT GAMES (UNIVERSIADE - WOMEN)

1965
1965 in Italian sport
Italy